Akayleb Evans (born June 22, 1999) is an American football cornerback for the Minnesota Vikings of the National Football League (NFL). He played college football at Tulsa before transferring to Missouri.

Early life and high school
Evans grew up in McKinney, Texas and attended McKinney High School. As a senior, he recorded 48 tackles, five pass breakups, and one fumble recovery and was named second-team all-District 10-6A. Evans initially committed to play college football at Kansas, but later flipped his commitment to Tulsa.

College career
Evans began his collegiate career with the Tulsa Golden Hurricane. As a freshman, he played in nine games with five starts and had 26 tackles and two passes broken up. Evans suffered a shoulder injury in the third game of his junior season and used a medical redshirt. He played in all nine of Tulsa's games during their COVID-19-shortened 2020 season and finished the year with 30 tackles (27 solo tackles), one sack, three passes broken up, and one forced fumble. After his redshirt junior season, Evans entered the transfer portal.

Evans transferred to Missouri as a graduate transfer. He had considered offers from Notre Dame, Texas, Texas Tech, and Jackson State. In his lone season with the Tigers, Evans was a starter at cornerback and finished the season with 28 tackles, two forced fumbles, six passes broken up, and one interception. After the conclusion of his college career, Evans played in the 2022 Senior Bowl.

Statistics

Professional career

Minnesota Vikings
Evans was drafted by the Minnesota Vikings with the 118th pick of the fourth round of the 2022 NFL Draft. 

Evans entered his rookie season as the fourth cornerback on the depth chart behind Patrick Peterson, Cameron Dantzler, and Chandon Sullivan. He recovered a surprise onside kick in a week 5 win over the Chicago Bears. He was placed on injured reserve on December 7, 2022.

NFL career statistics

References

External links
 Minnesota Vikings bio
Tulsa Golden Hurricane bio
Missouri Tigers bio

1999 births
Living people
Players of American football from Texas
Sportspeople from the Dallas–Fort Worth metroplex
American football cornerbacks
Missouri Tigers football players
People from McKinney, Texas
Tulsa Golden Hurricane football players
Minnesota Vikings players